Cen Elezi was an Albanian bayraktar, Colonel and nationalist.

Biography
Cen Elez Ndreu was born in Lisvalle (Sllove), Debre, Ottoman Empire (in modern Albania).  Ndreu was bayraktar of Dibra and Kolonel, he was son of Albanian well known patriot Elez Isuf Ndreu and grandson of Isuf Ndreu. He is considered as a nationalist figure of Albania.
Ndreu fought against Ottoman Empire alongside his father Isuf and people or Reç and liberated Peshkopi and The Greater Dibra.

On 16 April, he took part in Albanian peace delegation that went to Rome.
In 1916 Elezi was selected to be part of Liberation Committee of Kosovo in Shkodër.

References

Albanian anti-communists
1884 births
Colonels (military rank)
1949 deaths
People from Dibër (municipality)
People from Manastir vilayet
Albanians in the Ottoman Empire